Abe Sklar (November 25, 1925 – October 30, 2020) was an American mathematician and a professor of applied mathematics at the Illinois Institute of Technology (IIT) and the inventor of copulas in probability theory.

Education and career 
Sklar was born in Chicago to Jewish parents who immigrated to the United States from Ukraine. He attended Von Steuben High School and later enrolled at the University of Chicago in 1942, when he was only 16. Sklar went on to become a student of Tom M. Apostol at the California Institute of Technology, where he earned his Ph.D. in 1956. His students at IIT have included geometers Clark Kimberling and Marjorie Senechal.

In 1959, Sklar introduced the notion of and the name of "copulas" into probability theory and proved the theorem that bears his name, Sklar's theorem.  That is, that multivariate cumulative distribution functions can be expressed in terms of copulas. This representation of distribution functions, which is valid in any dimension and unique when the margins are continuous, is the basis of copula modeling, a widespread data analytical technique used in statistics; this representation is often termed Sklar's representation. Schweizer–Sklar t-norms are also named after Sklar and Berthold Schweizer, who studied them together in the early 1960s.

Bibliography

References

1925 births
2020 deaths
20th-century American mathematicians
21st-century American mathematicians
American people of Ukrainian-Jewish descent
California Institute of Technology alumni
Illinois Institute of Technology faculty
University of Chicago alumni
Probability theorists
American mathematicians
People from Chicago